Nicholas Duchnowski (12 December 1733 – 25 June 1805) was a bishop of the Ruthenian Uniate Church, Bishop of Suprasl and all unites in New East Prussia.

After the death of Theodosius Wislocki, Nicholas Duchnowski was selected locum tenens bishop of Suprasl until he was consecrated in 1804.

See also
 Supraśl Orthodox Monastery

References

External links
 Nicholas Duchnowski at the catholic-hierarchy.org

1733 births
1805 deaths
People from Podlaskie Voivodeship
Bishops of the Uniate Church of the Polish–Lithuanian Commonwealth